Mama's Hungry Eyes: A Tribute to Merle Haggard is a tribute album to American country music artist Merle Haggard. It was released in 1994 via Arista Nashville. The album peaked at number 52 on the Billboard Top Country Albums chart. Proceeds from the album go to Second Harvest Food Bank.

Critical reception
An uncredited review from AllMusic gave the album three stars out of five, stating that "throughout the album, the listener is constantly reminded of country music's debt to Haggard's songwriting." Alanna Nash of Entertainment Weekly gave it a C+, calling it "often mediocre."

Track listing

Chart performance

Album

Singles

References

1994 albums
Arista Records albums
Country albums by American artists
Merle Haggard tribute albums